The 2002 Kensington and Chelsea Borough Council election took place on 2 May 2002 to elect members of Kensington and Chelsea London Borough Council in London, England. The whole council was up for election with boundary changes since the last election in 1998. The Conservative Party stayed in overall control of the council.

Election result

Ward results

References

2002 London Borough council elections
2002
21st century in the Royal Borough of Kensington and Chelsea